The 2000 Akron Zips football team represented Akron University in the 2000 NCAA Division I-A football season; they competed in the Mid-American Conference. They were led by sixth–year head coach Lee Owens. The Zips played their home games at the Rubber Bowl in Akron, Ohio. They outscored their opponents 333–295 and finished with a record of 6 wins and 5 losses (6–5).

Schedule

Roster

References

Akron
Akron Zips football seasons
Akron Zips football